The Ekstraliga Baseball is the elite competition for the sport of baseball in Poland.  In it, the men's Polish championship is determined annually.  Like most European sports leagues, the Ekstraliga uses a system of promotion and relegation.  The highest division of the Ekstraliga currently consists of six teams, with each team playing four games against each other team.  The league is regulated by the Polish Baseball and Softball Federation (PZBiS).

2022 Teams
 Barons Wrocław
 Centaury Warszawa
 Dęby Osielsko
 Gepardy Żory 
 Stal BiS Kutno 
 Silesia Rybnik

Champions

External links
Polish Baseball and Softball Federation official website (Polish)
Baseball in Poland
Schaby  Warszawa 
Did Baseball Come to the US from Poland?

Baseball in Poland
Poland
Base
1984 establishments in Poland
Sports leagues established in 1984
Professional sports leagues in Poland